The 2011 Japanese motorcycle Grand Prix was the fifteenth round of the 2011 Grand Prix motorcycle racing season. It took place on the weekend of 29 September–2 October 2011 at the Twin Ring Motegi, located in Motegi, Japan. The Grand Prix, originally scheduled for 24 April, was moved to 2 October due to the effects of the Tōhoku earthquake and the Fukushima I nuclear accidents.

Due to concerns with possible radiation an independent survey of Motegi and the surrounding area was commissioned by FIM and Dorna Sports. That survey generated a preliminary report which stated "Based on the estimate dose it can be said by no doubt that the radiation risk during the race event is negligible." On 2 August the full report was received and the organisers stated that the race would take place as scheduled.

MotoGP classification

Moto2 classification

125 cc classification

Championship standings after the race (MotoGP)
Below are the standings for the top five riders and constructors after round fifteen has concluded.

Riders' Championship standings

Constructors' Championship standings

 Note: Only the top five positions are included for both sets of standings.

References

Japanese motorcycle Grand Prix
Japanese
Motorcycle Grand Prix
Japanese motorcycle Grand Prix